Sunshine Mall was a single-level, enclosed shopping mall located in Clearwater, Florida, U.S. It was anchored by Phar-Mor and Office Depot. It was owned by New Haven, Connecticut based Fusco Property Management.

History 
The mall was the first enclosed shopping center in Pinellas County, Florida.

It was at one time the largest climate-controlled mall on Florida's west coast. It was also the first in the Southern United States to offer valet parking.

The mall also featured a Trans-Lux single screen theater, Pantry Pride, SupeRx Drugs, and McCrory's. A second anchor, J Byrons, was confirmed in 1970. The theater was "twinned" into a two-screen theater in 1977, reopening in December; the theater had expanded to 5 screens by the time of closing. Pantry Pride closed at the mall in February 1979, and was replaced by Mr C's Warehouse Grocery by late 1979.

Office Depot opened in the former Sports Unlimited space in 1990. J Byrons closed at the mall in 1991, to be replaced by Phar-Mor, which was relocating from a nearby plaza. By July 1994, McCrory's had closed its doors and J. C. Penney had announced  intentions to leave by January, and the mall had stopped signing new leases for interior tenants, keeping existing tenants on month-to-month leases. A  rebuild of the mall was announced in 1995, which was to transform the mall into a strip mall power center, retaining an interior corridor, however this never came to pass. The mall was demolished beginning in July 1998 by Terra Excavating Inc of Largo, FL in order to make way for a 600-apartment complex.

References 

Demolished shopping malls in the United States
Shopping malls established in 1968
Shopping malls in Florida
Buildings and structures in Pinellas County, Florida
1968 establishments in Florida
1998 disestablishments in Florida